Qeshlaq-e Hajji Allahverdi (also Romanized as Qeshlāq-e Ḩājjī Allāhverdī; also known as Ḩājj ‘Azīzollāh and Ḩājjī ‘Azīz Aqā) is a village in Gowg Tappeh Rural District, in the Central District of Bileh Savar County, Ardabil Province, Iran. At the 2006 census, its population was 126, in 25 families.

References 

Towns and villages in Bileh Savar County